Didier Philippe (born 28 September 1961) is a French former professional footballer, who played as a defender, and later manager.

References

1961 births
Living people
French footballers
1. FC Saarbrücken players
AS Nancy Lorraine players
Stade Lavallois players
FC Martigues players
Association football defenders
2. Bundesliga players
Ligue 1 players
France under-21 international footballers
French expatriate footballers
Expatriate footballers in Germany
French expatriate sportspeople in Germany
French football managers
1. FC Saarbrücken managers
F91 Dudelange managers
French expatriate football managers
Expatriate football managers in Germany
Expatriate football managers in Luxembourg
French expatriate sportspeople in Luxembourg
FC Metz non-playing staff